Albertina Walker ( – ) was an American gospel singer, songwriter, actress, and humanitarian.

Early years
Walker was born in Chicago, Illinois, to Ruben and Camilla Coleman Walker.  Her mother was born in Houston County, Georgia, and her father in Bibb County, Georgia. They moved to Chicago between 1917 and 1920 where they lived out their lives. Albertina had four siblings born in Bibb County and four born in Chicago. Albertina began singing in the youth choir at the West Point Baptist Church at an early age, and joined several Gospel groups thereafter, including Pete Williams Singers, The Willie Webb Singers and the Robert Anderson Singers. Albertina was greatly influenced by Mahalia Jackson, her friend and confidante, whom Jackson took on the road when Albertina was just a teenager. "Mahalia used to kid me. She'd say, 'Girl, you need to go sing by yourself,'" recalled Walker in a 2010 Washington Post interview.  Albertina Walker did just that. In 1951, she formed the group called The Caravans. She was popularly referred to as the "Queen of Gospel Music", initially by such notables as the late Reverend James Cleveland and Rev. Jesse L. Jackson, Sr, for her outstanding achievements within the genre after the death of Mahalia Jackson in 1972.

Musical career
In the early 1950s Walker founded her own Gospel music group The Caravans, enlisting fellow singers from The Robert Anderson Singers (Ora Lee Hopkins, Elyse Yancey and Nellie Grace Daniels). The Caravans' membership has included: James Cleveland, Bessie Griffin, Shirley Caesar, Dorothy Norwood, Inez Andrews, Loleatta Holloway, John McNeil,  Cassietta George, and Delores Washington. Her discovery of these artists resulted in the nickname "Star Maker". Walker retired The Caravans in the late 1960s, performing as a solo artist.

In the mid-1970s, Walker signed with Savoy Records then Benson Records, Word Records, A&M Records, and other record companies, recording a series of solo projects, many of them with big church choirs including The Evangelical Choir, The Cathedral of Love Choir, The Metro Mass choir, and her own church choir, The West Point Choir. Albertina recorded her first solo project Put a Little Love in Your Heart in 1975. She also recorded several projects together with Reverend James Cleveland. To date, she has recorded over 60 albums, including gold selling hits "Please Be Patient With Me", "I Can Go to God in Prayer", "The Best Is Yet to Come", "Impossible Dream", and "Joy Will Come".  Walker sang for United States presidents George W. Bush and Bill Clinton, and South Africa's president, Nelson Mandela.

In 1995, Walker joined Thelma Houston, CeCe Peniston, Phoebe Snow and Lois Walden to record a gospel album in common, Good News in Hard Times, as the quintet called The Sisters of Glory.

Walker recorded a reunion album with her group The Caravans entitled Paved the Way, which was released by Malaco Records on September 5, 2006. Performers included Walker, Dorothy Norwood, Inez Andrews and Delores Washington.  The album was dubbed by Billboard magazine as one of the most memorable releases of 2006 and entered the Billboard charts in the top ten and remained in the top forty for sixteen weeks. Paved the Way was nominated for a Grammy, Dove, Soul Train Music Award and two Stellar Awards.

Influence
Ms. Walker is featured in the book entitled Who's Who in Black America as well as other volumes related to the Golden Age of Gospel Music.  She received several keys to various cities and was honored at the Chicago Gospel Festival where a bench bearing her name was placed in downtown Chicago's Grant Park. The City of Chicago paid tribute to Albertina by renaming 35th and Cottage Grove "Albertina Walker and The Caravans Drive". Albertina was also conferred an honorary Doctor of Letters Degree by the Chicago Theological Seminary, an institution of the University of Chicago.

Walker co-founded the Gospel Music Workshop of America along with James Cleveland.  Albertina also lent her support to many charitable organizations such as United Negro College Fund, American Cancer Society, National Council of Negro Women,  Nation of Islam's Million Family March, One Voice: "A Fight Against AIDS", NAACP and Operation Push. In 1988 Albertina Walker founded The Albertina Walker Scholarship Foundation for the Creative and Performing Arts. Her foundation offers financial assistance to college students in the form of scholarships to further their education in the field of music.

Death
On her 81st birthday, Walker was admitted to a local Chicago Hospital and placed on a ventilator.  For some time she had been battling emphysema. In early September, rumors of Walker's death had spread so wildly that she posted a message on her Facebook page stating: "I'm still here no matter what you might have heard". At the time, she was in ICU dealing with respiratory problems–a condition she battled for years, and kept her on oxygen. On Tuesday, September 7, Walker had a tracheostomy which doctors deemed a success, and she checked out of a Chicago hospital in late September and was admitted to RML specialty hospital for follow up care. She died on October 8, 2010 at 4:30 a.m.

Discography

Notable singles
 "I'm Still Here"
 "Please Be Patient with Me"
 "I Can Go to God in Prayer"
 "I Got a Feeling (Everything Will Be Alright)"
 "The Best Is Yet to Come"
 "Impossible Dream"
 "Joy Will Come"
 "God Is Our Creator"
 "Work on Me"
 "In Shady Green Pastures"
 "Don't Let Nobody Turn You Around"
 "When God Dips His Pin of Love in My Heart"
 "If I Perish"
 "Ain't Got Tired Yet"
 "Since I Met Jesus"
 "Lord Keep Me Day by Day"
 "Mary Don't You Weep" Albertina Walker
 "Remember Me"
 "I Know the Lord Will Make a Way"
 "I'm Willing"
 "Show Some Sign"
 "I Won't Be Back"
 "Make It In"
 "Jesus Will Fix It"

Videography

Film and other appearances
 Leap of Faith – starring Steve Martin and Debra Winger
 Going Home to Gospel with Patti Labelle
 The Gospel Truth – Off-Broadway play
 The Evolution of Gospel
 The Gospel Legends

Television appearances
Walker appeared on The Oprah Winfrey Show, Good Morning America and The Tavis Smiley Show among others. Albertina Walker was a frequent guest on the nationally syndicated BET and Word television networks, Bobby Jones Gospel, Testify and Singsation.

Awards and honors
Walker earned many awards and honors over her six decades of music ministry. Among them, a 1995 Grammy Award for the Best Traditional Gospel Album (Songs of The Church); 10 Grammy Award nominations; 5 Gold Records; 3 Stellar Awards; 3 Dove Awards; several Gospel Music Workshop of America Excellence Awards; an induction into the 2001 Gospel Music Hall of Fame in Nashville, Tennessee. President George Bush honored Albertina Walker for her contribution to gospel music on May 31, 2002. In 2005, the Grammys honored her contributions to the Gospel music industry. R.E.A.- Robert Estevis Award for the album, The Caravans, Paved The Way. She is also a recipient of a 2005 National Heritage Fellowship awarded by the National Endowment for the Arts, which is the United States government's highest honor in the folk and traditional arts.

References

Further reading

External links

1929 births
2010 deaths
Grammy Award winners
American gospel singers
20th-century African-American women singers
National Heritage Fellowship winners
Savoy Records artists
American contraltos
African-American women singer-songwriters
Baptists from Illinois
Deaths from respiratory failure
Singers from Chicago
20th-century Baptists
21st-century African-American women singers
Singer-songwriters from Illinois